Giampiero Boniperti (4 July 1928 – 18 June 2021) was an Italian footballer who played his entire 15-season career at Juventus between 1946 and 1961,  winning five Serie A titles and two Coppa Italia titles. He also played for the Italy national team at international level, and took part at the 1950 and 1954 FIFA World Cup finals, as well as the 1952 Summer Olympics with Italy. After retirement from professional football, Boniperti was a CEO and chairman of Juventus and, later, a deputy to the European Parliament.

A forward, Boniperti is regarded by several pundits, including Mario Sconcerti, as one of Italy's and Juventus's greatest ever players, and is considered by some in the sport, such as Bruno Nicolè, to be Italy's greatest player of all time; with 182 goals in all competitions, Boniperti was the highest goalscorer in Juventus history for more than 40 years, until his record was bested by Alessandro Del Piero on 10 January 2006. Del Piero also broke his club record of 443 Serie A appearances on 14 February 2010, when he played his 444th Serie A game in a 3–2 win against Genoa; with 443 Serie A appearances for Juventus, Boniperti is currently third in the club's rankings, behind only Del Piero and Gianluigi Buffon. Boniperti also held the record for most minutes played in Serie A by a Juventus player (39,680), until his record was surpassed by Buffon on 19 March 2017, in the 66th minute of a 1–0 away win over Sampdoria. Boniperti is the eleventh-highest goalscorer of all-time in Serie A. In March 2004, he was named by Pelé as one of the world's top 125 greatest living footballers.

Club career
Born in Barengo, Piedmont, Boniperti signed for Juventus at age 16; he had already built himself a reputation prior to this at youth level, as he scored 11 goals in one match. He could score successfully with both feet and was known for his power and tactical awareness.  He played his first match for the Old Lady in Serie A on 2 March 1947 against A.C. Milan, which ended in a 2–1 defeat. His first goal for them in the league was three months later, against Sampdoria. Juventus ended the 1946–47 Serie A season as runners-up to local rivals Torino, Giampiero ended the season with five goals in six games to his name.

Although he began as a centre forward, he could play also as an inside forward or on the right-wing. In his second season with Juventus, he was 20 years old and scored 27 goals during that season, finishing above Valentino Mazzola as the league's topscorer. Boniperti's first league championship with Juventus was during the 1949–50 season. By his 24th birthday he had scored 100 goals for the club, adding a second scudetto title to his name in 1951–52. Although he was named the club's captain in 1954, for much of the 1950s Juve and Boniperti struggled to put the club back to the top of the Italian championship.

In 1957 Juventus signed two forwards: John Charles and Omar Sivori. With them, Boniperti would be a part of what was referred to as the Magical Trio. During Boniperti's last four seasons at the club before his retirement, Juventus was successful in the Italian league, winning the Serie A three times (1957–58, 1959–60 and 1960–61), and the Coppa Italia twice (1958–59 and 1959–60). At the time of his retirement, Boniperti was Juventus' all-time top goalscorer with 182 in all competitions, this record stood for over 40 years before Alessandro Del Piero beat it on 10 January 2006. As of 2010, Boniperti was the second top goalscorer of all-time at Juventus and was seventh on the list of all-time top appearances for the club. With 443 appearances in Serie A for Juventus, he held the club record for most appearances in the competition, until long-serving player and former Juventus captain Alessandro Del Piero beat it on 14 February 2010.

International career

After playing 14 games in the Serie A league, Boniperti was called up to play for the Italy national football team, making his international debut on 9 November 1947, in a game against Austria; the match ended in a 5–1 loss to the Austrian side. He got even with Austria a couple of years later, when in May 1949 he scored his first international goal for Italy, with a 3–1 victory. Boniperti managed to achieve 38 caps (24 of which he played as captain) and scored 8 goals for Italy. Boniperti played for Italy in the 1950 and 1954 FIFA World Cup finals (captaining the team in the latter edition of the tournament), as well as in the 1952 Summer Olympics.

Style of play

A talented, creative, and prolific forward, with good technique, Boniperti is regarded by several pundits as one of the greatest and most successful Italian players of all time, and is considered by some in the sport, including Alessandro Del Piero, as one of Juventus's greatest players ever. A forward, he began his career as a striker, making a name for himself due to his eye for goal, and later emerging to prominence as a goalscorer for much of his career; in this role, he was usually supported by teammates such as John and Karl Aage Hansen, and Karl Aage Præst. As a centre-forward, he was known for his ability in the air and for having the capacity to score with both feet, as well as his head. A team player, in the later part of his career, he moved into a deeper position, functioning as a second striker or inside forward, as an attacking midfielder, as a winger, or even as a central midfielder, as a defensive midfielder, or as a midfield playmaker. Due to his ball control, technical ability, vision, tactical intelligence, and passing range, he excelled as an assist provider during the final few years of his career, creatively supporting his more offensive team mates John Charles and Omar Sívori. In addition to his footballing ability, he was also known for his leadership.

After retirement

Juventus executive

A short while after his retirement, the Agnelli family offered Boniperti an executive position as a director in the club's management team; in 1971, he was appointed the chairman of the board of directors, a position he held for many years, and still had a role at the club as one of the honorary chairmen (served along with Franzo Grande Stevens).

He often found the pressure of watching rather than playing quite unbearable, and was known to drive around Turin at half time and just listen to the match on the radio. When players asked for pay rises, Boniperti would point to photographs of recent defeats on the wall and turn them away in shame. The pressure of remaining Italy's top team was intense for him, even behind the scenes.

Politics
From 1994 until 1999, Boniperti was elected as a deputy in the European Parliament with the centre-right wing party Forza Italia.

Personal life
Boniperti's grandson Filippo has followed in his grandfather's footsteps in pursuing a career in football, and played for Juventus and the Italy U19 team as a midfielder. He is currently a free agent.

Boniperti died in Turin on 18 June 2021 due to heart failure, aged 92. The Italy national team wore black armbands in tribute to him in their match on 20 June against Wales in the UEFA Euro 2020.

Career statistics

Club

International 

Scores and results list Italy's goal tally first, score column indicates score after each Boniperti goal.

Honours
Juventus
Serie A: 1949–50, 1951–52, 1957–58, 1959–60, 1960–61
Coppa Italia: 1958–59, 1959–60

Individual
Serie A top scorer: 1947–48 (27 goals)
FIFA 100: 2004
Italian Football Hall of Fame: 2012
CONI Award for Outstanding Sporting Career: 2013

See also
One-club man

Notes

References

External links 

1928 births
2021 deaths
Sportspeople from the Province of Novara
FIFA 100
Italian footballers
Italy international footballers
Juventus F.C. players
Serie A players
1950 FIFA World Cup players
1954 FIFA World Cup players
Forza Italia politicians
MEPs for Italy 1994–1999
Olympic footballers of Italy
Footballers at the 1952 Summer Olympics
Association football forwards
Italy B international footballers
Juventus F.C. chairmen and investors
Italian sports executives and administrators
Italian sportsperson-politicians
Footballers from Piedmont